Denys Andriyenko (born 12 April 1980) is a Ukrainian footballer who plays for FC Kryvbas Kryvyi Rih in the Ukrainian Premier League.

Career
Andriyenko began playing football in the Ukrainian Second League with local club FC Dynamo Saky in 1997. He went on to play in the Ukrainian Premier League for SC Tavriya Simferopol and FC Metalurh Donetsk, both clubs sending him on loan spells to lower-division clubs. He joined Kryvbas for the first time in 2003. After one season, he left for FC Dnipro Dnipropetrovsk, only to return to Kryvbas in late 2008.

References

External links

Player profile 

1980 births
Living people
Ukrainian footballers
People from Yevpatoria
SC Tavriya Simferopol players
FC Tytan Armyansk players
FC Metalurh Donetsk players
FC Kryvbas Kryvyi Rih players
FC Dnipro players
FC Oleksandriya players
Ukrainian Premier League players
FC SKA-Khabarovsk players
Ukrainian expatriate footballers
Expatriate footballers in Russia
Ukrainian expatriate sportspeople in Russia
Association football midfielders